The gas mark is a temperature scale used on gas ovens and cookers in the United Kingdom, Ireland and some Commonwealth of Nations countries.

History
The draft 2003 edition of the Oxford English Dictionary lists the earliest known usage of the concept as being in L. Chatterton's book Modern Cookery published in 1943:  "Afternoon tea scones… Time: 20 minutes. Temperature: Gas, Regulo Mark 7". "Regulo" was a type of gas regulator used by a manufacturer of cookers; however, the scale has now become universal, and the word Regulo is rarely used.

The term "gas mark" was a subject of the joint BBC/OED production Balderdash and Piffle, in May 2005. The earliest printed evidence of use of "gas mark" (with no other terms between the two words) appears to date from 1958. However, the manufacturers of the "New World" gas ranges in the mid-1930s gave away recipe books for use with their cooker, and the "Regulo" was the gas regulator. The book has no reference to degrees. All dishes to be cooked are noted to be at "Regulo Mark X".

Equivalents in Fahrenheit and Celsius
Gas mark 1 is 275 degrees Fahrenheit (135 degrees Celsius).
Oven temperatures increase by 25 °F (13.9 °C) each time the gas mark increases by 1. Below Gas Mark 1 the scale markings halve at each step, each representing a decrease of 25 °F.

For temperatures above 135 °C (gas mark 1) to convert gas mark to degrees Celsius multiply the gas mark number by 14, then add 121:

 

For the reverse conversion: 

 

These do not work for  less than 1. For temperatures below 135 °C (gas mark 1), to convert gas mark to degrees Celsius apply the following conversion:

 

For the reverse: 

It is usual to round the results of such calculations to a round number of degrees Celsius.

 
Note that tables of temperature equivalents for kitchen use usually offer Celsius values rounded to the nearest 10 degrees, with steps of either 10 or 20 degrees between Gas Marks.

Other cooking temperature scales
French ovens and recipes often use a scale based on the Fahrenheit scale, which itself has never been used in France: "Thermostat" (abbreviated "Th"), where Thermostat 1 equals 100 °F for conventional ovens, increasing by 50 °F for each whole number along the scale.

In Germany, "Stufe" (the German word for "step") is used for gas cooking temperatures. Gas ovens are commonly marked in steps from 1 to 8, corresponding to:

Other ovens may be marked on a scale of 1–7, where Stufe  is about 125 °C in a conventional oven, Stufe 1 is about 150 °C, increasing by 25 °C for each subsequent step, up to Stufe 7 at 300 °C.

References

Scales of temperature
Ovens